Friedrich August von Ammon (10 September 1799 – 18 May 1861) was a German surgeon and ophthalmologist born in Göttingen. He was the son of theologian Christoph Friedrich von Ammon (1766–1850).

He studied medicine at the Universities of Göttingen and Leipzig, and following an educational journey through Germany and Paris, he settled in Dresden in 1823 as a physician. Here his primary focus dealt with surgical and surgical-anatomical duties. In 1828 he attained the title of professor, becoming director of the surgical-medical academy in Dresden. In 1837 he was named royal physician to Friedrich August II, King of Saxony.

Known for his work in ophthalmology, he was instrumental in making Dresden a center of ophthalmic learning during his lifetime. In 1830 founded Zeitschrift für die Ophthalmologie, an early journal devoted to ophthalmology. In his prize-winning book, De Iritide (1835), he made contributions involving investigations of iritis and sympathetic ophthalmia.

His most ambitious written effort in the field of ophthalmology was Klinische Darstellung der Krankheiten und Bildungsfehler des menschlichen Auges, a monograph acclaimed for its comprehensive treatment of eye disease, as well as for its superb hand-colored illustrations and its descriptions of congenital eye anomalies.

One of Ammon's earlier works was an impartial comparative study between French and German surgery titled Vergleich zwischen französischer und deutscher Chirurgie (1823). In 1842 he co-authored a significant book on plastic surgery, Die plastische Chirurgie.

Selected writings 

 De genesi et usu maculae luteae in retina oculi humani obviae, (Weimar 1830) 
 Die Erkenntniss und die Behandlung der asiatischen Cholera : mit Berücksichtigung der durch Leichenöffnungen gewonnenen Aufklärungen über das Wesen dieser Krankheit und mit einem Verzeichnisse der bei Behandlung derselben erprobten und vorgeschlagenen Heilmittel und Heilformeln versehen. Walther, Dresden 3rd edition 1831 Digital edition by the University and State Library Düsseldorf
 De physiologia tenotomiae (The physiology of tenotomy), (Dresden 1837) 
 Klinische Darstellung der Krankheiten und Bildungsfehler des menschlichen Auges etc. (Berlin 1838–1847, four volumes) - Clinical presentation of diseases and malformations of the human eye.
 Die Behandlung des Schielens durch den Muskelschnitt, (Berlin 1840) - Treatment of squinting.
 De Iritide, (Berlin, 1843) - Treatise on iritis.
 Illustrierte pathologische Anatomie der menschlichen Kornea, Sklera, Choroidea und des optischen Nerom, (hrsg. von Warnatz, Leipzig 1862) - Illustrated pathological anatomy of the cornea, sclera, choroid and the optic nerve. 
 Die angebornen chirurgischen Krankheiten des Menschen (Berlin, 1839–1842) - Innate surgical diseases of humans. 
 Die plastische Chirurgie, (with Moritz Baumgarten, Berlin, 1842) - On plastic surgery.

See also
 Pathology
 List of pathologists

References 

 List of publications copied from an equivalent article at the German Wikipedia.

1799 births
1861 deaths
Physicians from Göttingen
German ophthalmologists
German pathologists
University of Göttingen alumni
Leipzig University alumni